Teofils Biķis (Liepāja, 1952–2000) was a Latvian pianist.

He was trained at the Moscow Conservatory under Lev Vlassenko, graduating in 1975. That same year he won the Vianna da Motta International Music Competition and was appointed a teacher at the Novosibirsk Conservatory. In 1989 he was promoted to the Latvian Academy of Music, where he held a professorship and led the piano department. He served subsequently as the president of the European Piano Teachers Association's Latvian branch.

References

  Music in Latvia
  Vianna da Motta competition 2nd Spring 1998 newsletter

1952 births
2000 deaths
Musicians from Liepāja
Latvian classical pianists
20th-century classical pianists
Academic staff of Novosibirsk Conservatory